Björk is an Icelandic singer-songwriter, producer and actress from Reykjavík who has received many awards and nominations for her work. After gaining international popularity as the lead singer of The Sugarcubes, she rose to prominence with the release of her first album Debut in 1993. During this time, she won several awards, including the Brit Award for International Breakthrough Act and the NME Award for Best Solo Artist. At the 1994 MTV Video Music Awards the music video for her first single "Human Behaviour" received six nominations. With the release of her second album Post (1995) the singer won five Icelandic Music Awards and the MTV Europe Music Award for Best Female and became the first artist to receive the Vanguard Award at the ASCAP Awards. The video for her single "It's Oh So Quiet" won the MTV Video Music Award for Best Choreography in a Video. The singer's third album, titled Homogenic, was released in 1997. The album's music videos were acclaimed, with the videos for "Bachelorette", directed by Michel Gondry, and "All Is Full of Love", directed by Chris Cunningham, receiving multiple accolades, including three MTV Video Music Awards for Best Art Direction, Breakthrough Video and Best Visual Effects.

In 2000, Björk starred in Lars von Trier's musical melodrama film Dancer in the Dark, which premiered at the 2000 Cannes Film Festival, winning the Palme d'Or. For her role as Selma Ježková in the movie, the singer received the Cannes Film Festival Award for Best Actress and the European Film Award for Best Actress and garnered a nomination for the Golden Globe Award for Best Actress in a Motion Picture – Drama. Björk also composed the movie's soundtrack Selmasongs, which included the song "I've Seen It All". The song received a nomination for Best Original Song at the 58th Golden Globe Awards and was also nominated in the Best Original Song category at the 73rd Academy Awards, during which Björk wore her famous swan dress.

The music video for "Wanderlust", the fourth single from her sixth studio album Volta (2007), was one of the world first music video shot in stereoscopic 3D and received numerous accolades, including three UK Music Video Awards. In 2010, she received the Polar Music Prize, bestowed from the Royal Swedish Academy of Music, an honor considered the "Nobel Prize of Music". With the release of her seventh album Biophilia (2011), Björk garnered the Artist of the Year prize from the Webby Awards and the MPG Innovation Award from the Music Producers Guild. Biophilia and its related app were included in the Museum of Modern Art permanent collection. In 2015, the museum honored the singer with a self-titled artist retrospective, curated by Klaus Biesenbach. After the exhibition, Björk conceived Björk Digital, an immersive exhibit, in which she displayed virtual reality videos for songs taken from her eight studio album Vulnicura (2015). The visual for the song "Notget" won the Grand Prix in the Digital Craft category at the 2017 Cannes Lions International Festival of Creativity.

Björk is the fifth most successful international artist at the Brit Awards, with five awards won, and she's also the artist with the most wins and nominations in the International Female Solo Artist category. With sixteen nominations accrued at the Grammy Awards, she's tied with Brian McKnight and Dave Kutch as the third most nominated artist to have never won, behind Zubin Mehta, Snoop Dogg and Chris Gehringer, also making her the female artist with most nominations to have never won. Aside from her accolades in music and film, the singer received the Order of the Falcon from the President of Iceland in 1997 and the Ordre national du Mérite from the President of France in 2001. In 2015, she was included in Time's list of the 100 most influential people in the world.

Awards and nominations

Notes

References

External links
 Official website

Bjork
Awards